Nicolao Manuel Dumitru Cardoso (born 12 October 1991) is an Italian professional footballer who plays for Israeli Premier League club Bnei Sakhnin. Mainly a left winger, he can also play as a forward.

Club career

Early career
Dumitru started his professional career at Empoli, in a match during the 2008–09 season in Serie B. He also played another game in the following season, still at Serie B level.

Napoli
On 31 August 2010, he was signed by Serie A club S.S.C. Napoli at age 18 and 11 months. He failed to break into the first team during his period at Napoli, making only nine Serie A appearances at the club. Dumitru also played a few games for the reserve.

Return to Empoli
On 20 July 2011, it was announced Dumitru would return to Empoli in Serie B for the 2011–12 season on a one-year loan basis. On 27 August he scored on his debut, in the first match of the league, against Juve Stabia.

Further Italian loan spells
On 23 July 2012, Dumitru joined Serie B club Ternana on a season-long loan deal until the end of the 2012–13 season. On 31 January 2013 the loan was terminated. Dumitru joined Citadella on a temporary deal the same day. He joined Reggina on loan for the 2013–14 season.

Veria
On 13 August 2014, Greek club Veria announced the loan signing of Dumitru from Napoli on a one-year deal. He debuted on 24 August 2014 in the season's premiere home match against Skoda Xanthi where he scored his first goal. On 13 September 2014, in a match against Kerkyra, he scored his second goal and was the victim of "derogatory and racist remarks" Horacio Cardozo. The incident was reported by Veria's squad and Cardozo was invited by the Hellenic Football Federation to further give an explanation of the incident that took place. The HFF found Cardozo not guilty due to the lack of strong evidence. Dumitru was twice nominated for the Best Goal award for the goals that he scored on the first matchday as well as on the third, and won the award for his second goal in the championship. He also scored twice on his 2014–15 Greek Cup debut in home 4–1 victory against Ermionida. He got his first assist with Veria against PAS Giannina where Nikos Kaltsas scored. He scored his third championship goal in a home victory against Levadiakos during Superleague's seventh matchday.

Nottingham Forest
On 30 August 2016, Dumitru joined Nottingham Forest on a season-long loan. On 30 December 2016, he scored his first goal for the club in a 3–1 loss against Newcastle United.

Alcorcón and Gimnàstic
On 1 August 2017, Dumitru signed a two-year deal with Spanish Segunda División club AD Alcorcón. The following 11 January, he moved to fellow league team Gimnàstic de Tarragona after cutting ties with the Madrid side.

Livorno
On 5 February 2019, Dumitru signed with Italian club Livorno.

Gaz Metan Mediaș
On 25 July 2019, Dumitru signed a two-year contract with Romanian club Gaz Metan Mediaș.

Later years
On 14 Jan 2021, Dumitru signed a contract with Korean club Suwon Bluewings. After spending the first half of 2022 back in Romania with UTA Arad, he successively signed a one-year contract for Bnei Sakhnin in Israel.

International career
Dumitru was eligible to play international football for Sweden by birth, Brazil through his mother, Romania through his father and Italy through residency, his family having migrated there from Sweden when he was a child.

With the Italy U-19 national team in 2010, he took part in the U-19 European Championship. He was also a member of the Italy U-20 national team.

Personal life
Dumitru was born in Nacka, Sweden to a Romanian father (who later took Italian citizenship) and an Afro-Brazilian mother, and successively moved to Empoli, Tuscany in 1998 with his parents. He is fluent in Romanian.

Career statistics

Club

References

External links
 
 
 

1991 births
Living people
People from Nacka Municipality
Italian footballers
Italy youth international footballers
Swedish footballers
Swedish emigrants to Italy
Italian people of Romanian descent
Italian people of Brazilian descent
Brazilian people of Romanian descent
Swedish people of Romanian descent
Swedish people of Brazilian descent
Association football wingers
Association football forwards
Serie A players
Serie B players
Empoli F.C. players
S.S.C. Napoli players
Ternana Calcio players
A.S. Cittadella players
Reggina 1914 players
Latina Calcio 1932 players
Veria F.C. players
Nottingham Forest F.C. players
AD Alcorcón footballers
Gimnàstic de Tarragona footballers
U.S. Livorno 1915 players
CS Gaz Metan Mediaș players
Suwon Samsung Bluewings players
FC UTA Arad players
Bnei Sakhnin F.C. players
Super League Greece players
English Football League players
Segunda División players
Liga I players
Israeli Premier League players
Italian expatriate footballers
Expatriate footballers in Greece
Expatriate footballers in England
Expatriate footballers in Spain
Expatriate footballers in Israel
Italian expatriate sportspeople in Greece
Italian expatriate sportspeople in England
Italian expatriate sportspeople in Spain
Italian expatriate sportspeople in Israel
Sportspeople from Stockholm County